Kuhmareh may refer to:
 Kuhmareh District
 Kuhmareh Rural District